Firuzian (also Romanized as Fīrūzīān; also known as Farīzbān and Ferīzīān) is a village in Beradust Rural District, Sumay-ye Beradust District, Urmia County, West Azerbaijan Province, Iran. At the 2006 census, its population was 452, in 77 families.

References 

Populated places in Urmia County